Emmett Hughes (born 28 January 1987 in Headford, Galway) is an Irish actor, writer and producer. He has worked in Dublin, London, Sydney and Los Angeles.

Emmett is best known for playing the role of Gareth O'Brien in The O'Briens and as William Cullen in Ar Scáth le Chéile. He wrote, starred and produced both films. He wrote and starred in the 2017 independent thriller Axis, which marked Aisha Tyler's feature film directorial debut.

Filmography

Television

Films

References

External links 

Twitter
Facebook

Living people
1987 births
Irish male film actors
Irish male television actors
Irish film producers
Male actors from County Galway